{{DISPLAYTITLE:C6H10N2O5}}
The molecular formula C6H10N2O5 may refer to:

 ADA (buffer), a zwitterionic organic chemical buffering agent
 Carglumic acid, an orphan drug marketed by Orphan Europe under the trade name Carbaglu